Mansour Guettaya (born 26 December 1949) is a Tunisian former middle distance runner who competed in the 1972 Summer Olympics.

References

External links
 

1949 births
Living people
Tunisian male middle-distance runners
Olympic athletes of Tunisia
Athletes (track and field) at the 1972 Summer Olympics
Mediterranean Games gold medalists for Tunisia
Mediterranean Games medalists in athletics
Athletes (track and field) at the 1971 Mediterranean Games
20th-century Tunisian people
21st-century Tunisian people